The Movement is a compilation album from D.I.T.C. Records. It features all new songs, exclusive to this release only. Rather than a proper D.I.T.C. release focusing on the eight members of the original group, the compilation showcases the work of long-time affiliates such as The Ghetto Dwellas, Bo$$ Money and A-Bless alongside OC and AG of the main crew. Lord Finesse, Buckwild and Show all contribute beats to the project, however neither Diamond D nor Fat Joe had any involvement whatsoever. The Movement features one of the last tracks recorded by The Ghetto Dwellas member Party Arty, who died shortly after the release of the album due to health complications. Show acts as the project's executive producer and the album was self-released through D.I.T.C. Records.

Track listing

Diggin' in the Crates Crew albums
Albums produced by Lord Finesse
Albums produced by Showbiz (producer)
Albums produced by Buckwild
2008 compilation albums